Felix Kitur (born April 17, 1987) is a middle-distance track runner who specializes in the 800 metres. Running for Virginia Military Institute, he qualified for the NCAA Men's Division I Outdoor Track and Field Championships four times, before which he became a full-time professional for Santa Monica Track Club. He competes for Kenya internationally.

Running career

Collegiate
Kitur attended and ran for Virginia Military Institute. He ran the NCAA Men's Division I Outdoor Track and Field Championships on four occasions. In his freshman year he was ranked as the fastest college freshman in the 800-meter discipline in the United States.

Post-collegiate
Kitur pursued track after college, and began training full-time at Santa Monica Track Club. He represented Kenya in the 800-meter at an international track meet in Bilbao, Spain in 2013. On May 17, 2013, Kitur was given a DQ (disqualification) mark for a lane violation after running what would have been a personal best time of 1:44.84 (min:sec) in the 800 metres.

References

Kenyan male middle-distance runners
1987 births
Living people
People from Uasin Gishu County